In mechanical engineering, an overconstrained mechanism is a linkage that has more degrees of freedom than is predicted by the mobility formula. The mobility formula evaluates the degree of freedom of a system of rigid bodies that results when constraints are imposed in the form of joints between the links.

If the links of the system move in three-dimensional space, then the mobility formula is

If the links in the system move planes parallel to a fixed plane, or in concentric spheres about a fixed point, then the mobility formula is

If a system of links and joints has mobility  or less, yet still moves, then it is called an overconstrained mechanism.

Reason of over-constraint 

The reason of over-constraint is the unique geometry of linkages in these mechanisms, which the mobility formula does not take into account. This unique geometry gives rise to "redundant constraints", i.e. when multiple joints are constraining the same degrees of freedom. These redundant constraints are the reason of the over-constraint. 

For example, as shown in the figure to the right, consider a hinged door with 3 hinges. The mobility criterion for this door gives the mobility to be -1. Yet, the door moves and has a degree of freedom 1, as all its hinges have colinear axes.

Examples of over-constrained mechanisms

Multi-hinged doors and the like 

The figure on the left shows a two-hinged trunk lid. The calculated mobility for the lid relative to the car body is zero, yet it moves as its hinges (which are pin joints) have colinear axes. In this case, the second hinge is kinematically redundant.

Parallel linkage 

A well-known example of an overconstrained mechanism is the parallel linkage with multiple cranks, as seen in the running gear of steam locomotives.

Sarrus linkage 

Sarrus mechanism consists of six bars connected by six hinged joints.  

A general spatial linkage formed from six links and six hinged joints has mobility

and is therefore a structure. 

The Sarrus mechanism has one degree of freedom whereas the mobility formula yields M = 0, which means it has a particular set of dimensions that allow movement.

Bennett's linkage 

Another example of an overconstrained mechanism is Bennett's linkage, invented by Geoffrey Thomas Bennett in 1903, which consists of four links connected by four revolute joints.

A general spatial linkage formed from four links and four hinged joints has mobility

which is a highly constrained system. 

As in the case of the Sarrus linkage, it is a particular set of dimensions that makes the Bennett linkage movable. 

The dimensional constraints that makes Bennett's linkage movable are the following. Let us number the links in order that links with consecutive index are joined (first and fourth links are also joined). For the i-th link, let us denote by di and ai respectively the distance and the oriented angle of the axes of the revolute joints of the link. Bennett's linkage must satisfies the following constraints:

Moreover, the links are assembled in such a way that, for two links that are joined together, the common perpendicular to the joint axes of the first link intersects the common perpendicular of the joint axes of the second link. 

Below is an external link to an animation of a Bennett's linkage.

Watt steam engine 

James Watt employed an approximate straight line four-bar linkage to maintain a near rectilinear motion of the piston rod, thus eliminating the need of using a crosshead.

Hoberman mechanism 

Same as the crank-driven elliptic trammel, Hoberman mechanisms move because of their particular geometric configurations.

Assembly of cognate linkages 
Overconstrained mechanisms can be also obtained by assembling together cognate linkages; when their number is more than two, overconstrained mechanisms with negative calculated mobility will result. 
  The companion animated GIFs show overconstrained mechanisms obtained by assembling together four-bar coupler cognates and function cognates of the Watt II type.

References

External links
 
 
 Mobility of Overconstrained Parallel Mechanisms

Linkages (mechanical)